Aiguá is a city of the Maldonado Department in Uruguay. Its name means running water in the Guaraní language. It is also the name of the municipality to which the city belongs. It includes the following zones: Aiguá, Sauce de Aiguá, Sarandí de Aiguá, Alférez, Valdivia, Salamanca, Coronilla, Rincón de Aparicio, Los Talas, Paso de los Talas.

Geography

It is situated on the east bank of the stream Arroyo de Aiguá, one of the main tributaries of Cebollatí River.

The municipality of Aiguá has the highest point of Uruguay, the Cerro Catedral.

History
On 9 May 1906 it was declared a "Pueblo" (village) and its status was elevated to "Ciudad" (city) on 4 January 1956 by decree Ley No. 12.265.

Population
In 2011 Aiguá had a population of 2,465. According to the Intendencia Departamental de Maldonado, the municipality of Aiguá has a population of 4,500.
 
Source: Instituto Nacional de Estadística de Uruguay

Places of worship
 Parish Church of St. Anthony of Padua and Our Lady of the Valley of Aiguá (Roman Catholic)

Notable people 
 Domingo Burgueño Miguel, mayor of Maldonado
 Arturo Fajardo, Roman Catholic bishop
Gustavo Fajardo, Chief of the Defence Staff of Uruguay

See also
 Maldonado Department

References

External links

 Ciudad de Aiguá, Site of the municipality of Maldonado, Uruguay.
INE map of Aiguá

Populated places in the Maldonado Department
Populated places established in 1892